The Berliner Kammeroper was a Berlin opera company with changing venues, founded in 1981 by Henry Akina and .

Around seventy works of music theatre, mostly rarely or previously unperformed, from various genres were developed, including proper chamber opera as well as pre-classical opera and contemporary repertoire. Since 2004, the Berliner Kammeroper has concentrated on the development of contemporary chamber operas and world premieres. All productions were Berlin premieres. Many productions were developed as domestic and foreign co-productions or went on tour.

In 2012/13, the management team consisted of Katharina Tarján (dramaturgy/public relations) and Karin Lindner (production management). In 2013, the performances were discontinued.

Further reading 
 Peter Meisel: 10 Jahre Berliner Kammeroper. Edition Hentrich, Berlin 1991, .

References

External links 
 

Opera houses in Germany
Musical groups from Berlin
German opera companies